Treehouse TV is a Canadian English-language discretionary specialty channel for preschoolers that was launched in 1997. Its name comes from YTV's former preschool block, "The Treehouse". The channel is owned by YTV Canada, Inc., a subsidiary of Corus Entertainment.

Development of a separate channel started when YTV aired preschool shows as part of its weekday morning lineup. This block of shows was given the name "The Treehouse" in 1994. On November 1, 1997, Treehouse TV launched as its own channel, airing preschool shows from 6 a.m. to 3 a.m. daily.

Like the block it was spun off from, commercials weren't broadcast when the Treehouse channel first launched. Instead, shorts hosted by humans and puppets were broadcast. As of 2011, Treehouse TV had been available to over 7.5 million homes across Canada.

History

The Treehouse block

The Treehouse brand began as a daily programming block for preschoolers on YTV. The block was given the name "The Treehouse" in 1994. Commercials for the block weren't shown. Instead, the block was hosted by three program jockeys (or "PJs") named PJ Katie, PJ Krista, and PJ Todd. In between shows, the PJs made crafts, played games, and held contests. As the block's name suggests, these segments were set in a tree house.

The PJs' co-hosts were a group of stuffed animal puppets called the Fuzzpaws. On Fridays, PJ Katie would act out stories with clay animals. These segments were eventually spun off into the series PJ Katie's Farm.

Treehouse channel

In early 1996, it was announced that YTV was looking to "break part of [its] audience off with a separate network aimed at viewers under the age of 6." The network's president, Patricia Macdonald, said she had "done a lot of research that led us to the conclusion that the preschool market is underserved." On September 4, 1996, the Canadian Radio-television and Telecommunications Commission (CRTC) approved YTV's request to launch a new channel called Treehouse TV.

The new channel eventually debuted on November 1, 1997, at 8:00 a.m. EST. For a few months, The Treehouse block on YTV continued to air alongside the channel. In 1998, the Treehouse block was replaced by YTV Jr., an unhosted block.

Like the Treehouse block, the Treehouse channel was non-commercial, opting instead to show interstitial shorts in between shows. These shorts featured a new set of characters who lived in Treetown. While the PJs (program jockeys) from the original Treehouse block did not return for the Treehouse channel, PJ Katie's show (PJ Katie's Farm) was rerun on Treehouse throughout 1999.

In March 2005, Corus Entertainment began offering a video on demand service called Treehouse On Demand to cable providers such as Rogers Cable and Cogeco, delivering content from Treehouse TV. It is offered as a free service to customers who subscribe to each providers digital cable service. Some providers such as SaskTel offer it as a standalone premium subscription service. Between June 2015 and May 2019, Corus operated TreehouseGO, a TV Everywhere service available on iOS and Android devices.

In 2011, Corus launched a standalone subscription video on demand service for iOS. It was later rebranded to Treehouse Classic before a 2016 revamp dropped the "Classic" branding.

On February 5, 2013, Nelvana, Corus Entertainment's animation division, launched the Treehouse Direct channel on YouTube. On March 2, 2015, Treehouse TV launched its own YouTube channel.

On July 19, 2019, Corus Entertainment filed a copyright infringement lawsuit against a medical marijuana dispensary chain, known as "Treehouse Dispensary", alleging the chain "wilfully copied and is using a confusing similar imitation" of the Treehouse TV logo. An attorney for the dispensary contested the claims and said that the business "categorically denies that its logo infringes on any existing trademarks in the United States." Corus won the lawsuit through a default judgment the following December.

On July 4, 2022, the CRTC announced plans for Cartoon Network, Adult Swim, Nickelodeon, Teletoon, Télétoon, YTV, Disney Channel, La Chaîne Disney, Disney Junior and Disney XD have been renewed for another two years (licences valid until August 31, 2024).

Programming

See also
 Family Jr.
 Telebimbi
 Télémagino
 TeleNiños
 Yoopa

References

External links
 

1997 establishments in Canada
Children's television networks in Canada
Preschool education television networks
Commercial-free television networks
English-language television stations in Canada
Corus Entertainment networks
Analog cable television networks in Canada